Saïd Boutahar (born 12 August 1982) is a Dutch former professional footballer who played as a midfielder. He made one appearance each for the Netherlands U18 national team.

Club career
Born in Rotterdam, Boutahar played alongside the likes of Robin van Persie and Mounir El Hamdaoui in the streets of the Kralingen neighborhood. He made his debut in professional football, being part of the Feyenoord squad in the 2001–02 season. He also played for Excelsior Rotterdam, RKC Waalwijk, N.E.C. and Willem II.

He moved abroad to play for Spanish side Real Zaragoza in 2010 after he decided not to renew his contract with Willem II. In 2014, he appeared to be one of 41 suspects to be involved in a 2011 match-fixing scandal around Zaragoza's win over Levante on the final day of the 2010–11 season which kept Zaragoza up.

In 2011, he moved on to play in the Gulf and joined Al-Wakrah in Qatar. He later played for Umm-Salal and Al-Shamal.

References

External links
 

1982 births
Living people
Dutch people of Riffian descent
Dutch sportspeople of Moroccan descent
Dutch footballers
Footballers from Rotterdam]
Association football midfielders
Netherlands youth international footballers
Eredivisie players
La Liga players
Qatar Stars League players
Qatari Second Division players
Feyenoord players
Excelsior Rotterdam players
RKC Waalwijk players
NEC Nijmegen players
Willem II (football club) players
Real Zaragoza players
Al-Wakrah SC players
Umm Salal SC players
Al-Shamal SC players
Dutch expatriate footballers
Dutch expatriate sportspeople in Spain
Expatriate footballers in Spain
Dutch expatriate sportspeople in Qatar
Expatriate footballers in Qatar